Leonard Shayo (born 1948) is a Tanzanian politician and member of the Demokrasia Makini party. Running as the party's presidential candidate in the 14 December 2005 elections, Shayo placed ninth out of ten candidates, receiving 0.15% of the vote.

References

1948 births
Living people
Demokrasia Makini politicians
Date of birth missing (living people)
21st-century Tanzanian politicians